Uchquloch is an urban-type settlement in Jizzakh Region, Uzbekistan. It is part of Forish District. The town population in 1989 was 3767 people.

References

Populated places in Jizzakh Region
Urban-type settlements in Uzbekistan